Wazu or WAZU may refer to:
 Va people, called "Wǎzú" in Chinese
 Words Worth, an erotic anime and video game known as Wāzu Wāsu in Japanese
 Wudu, an Islamic washing ritual called "wazū'" in Urdu

Radio stations 
 WAZU, a non-commercial radio station in Peoria, Illinois
 WJYD, a Columbus, Ohio area radio station that used the call sign from January 1997 to January 2007
 WSAI, a Cincinnati, Ohio radio station that used the call sign from August 1996 to December 1997
 WAXL, a southern Indiana radio station that used the call sign from June 1995 to 1996
 WDHT, a Dayton-area radio station that used the call sign from 1979 to May 1995

See also 
 Wazoo (disambiguation)